The 1944 season was the thirty-third season for Santos FC.

References

External links
Official Site 

Santos
1944
1944 in Brazilian football